Railway Residential Complex ( – Mojtame` Masḵūnī Rāh Ahan) is a village in Isin Rural District, in the Central District of Bandar Abbas County, Hormozgan Province, Iran. At the 2006 census, its population was 916, in 227 families.

References 

Populated places in Bandar Abbas County